The International Kim Il-sung Prize is an award conferred for contributions in the study and proliferation of the Juche idea. It is named in honor of Kim Il-sung, the first supreme leader of the North Korea, credited with creation of the Juche idea.

The prize was instituted on April 13, 1993, when North Korea organized the International Kim Il-sung Prize Council in New Delhi, India, to celebrate the 81st birthday of Kim Il-sung (April 15, 1993) internationally.

The International Kim Il-sung Prize consists of a gold medal, certificate, a sum of money and a souvenir token.

Prize Council
The International Kim Il-sung Prize Council selects and decides the candidate and organizes the conferment of the prize. The Council was officially registered in India and its headquarters is in New Delhi. The Council consists of one secretary-general and seven directors.

The composition of the council is not made public, but the following persons are known to have been members:
Alva Chavez, director (2002), member (2007)
Shuhachi Inoue, director, 2002
Vishwanath, secretary general, 2012

Since 2007, the prize has been awarded by the International Kim Il-sung Foundation (reorganized as the Kim Il-sung-Kim Jong-il Foundation in 2012).

Recipients

Shuhachi Inoue, 1993, first recipient
One person was awarded in 1994, another one in 1995, and two people in 1996
Vishwanath, April 13, 2002
Kim Jong-il, February 16, 2007
Norodom Sihanouk, 29 March 2012
Ramon Jimenez Lopez, director-general of the International Institute of the Juche Idea, April 6, 2018

In 2014, Ugandan president Yoweri Museveni was nominated for the award, but repeatedly declined to receive it.

See also

Kim Il-sung Prize
Orders and medals of North Korea
Order of Kim Il-sung
International Kim Jong-il Prize

References

Works cited

External links
Kim Il Sung-Kim Jong Il Foundation  at Naenara
 

Kim Il-sung
Orders, decorations, and medals of North Korea